The Golf Show, currently branded as The New Golf Show, is an Australian golf television series broadcast on Fox Sports on Tuesday nights.

The show was launched in 1997 with Brett Ogle the longest-serving host from 2002 to 2016. In 2016, the show was briefly replaced by different golf programming on Fox Sports. In October 2016, the show relaunched as The New Golf Show featuring Andrew Daddo as host and Paul Gow and Louise Ransome as presenters.

See also

 List of longest-running Australian television series

References

External links
 

1990s Australian reality television series
2000s Australian reality television series
2010s Australian reality television series
English-language television shows
Australian sports television series
1997 Australian television series debuts
Fox Sports (Australian TV network) original programming
Golf on television